State Route 626 (SR 626) is a north–south state highway in the northeastern portion of the U.S. state of Ohio.

Established in the late 1930s, State Route 626 is a two-lane highway that primarily serves local traffic in the southeastern Mahoning County municipality of Beaver Township.  Along its path, SR 626 is briefly concurrent with SR 164 to cross over the Ohio Turnpike (Interstate 76 or I-76) just west of the partial interchange it has with I-680.

Route description
This state highway runs exclusively within Beaver Township in southeastern Mahoning County. SR 626 is not included within the National Highway System.

Running northwesterly from that intersection, the two-lane state route passes a number of houses, with woods abutting the roadway along the way. At Miley Road, the highway turns to the north-northwest, and passes just to the west of the partial I-680 interchange off of the Ohio Turnpike (I-76). SR 626 then bends to the northwest, and comes into a T-intersection with SR 164. The route passes by a couple of commercial buildings as it departs the intersection, then travels amidst a blend of wooded terrain and open fields with scattered homes along the way. SR 626 intersects County Road 30 (East Calla Road), then continues in a northwesterly fashion, crossing railroad tracks and then passing by the Kreps Road intersection. Next, the highway passes into a more heavily residential setting, and intersects a number of side streets.

History
SR 626 was created in 1937 along the routing that it currently occupies between SR 165 and SR 7. Except for a realignment away from the intersection of SR 7 and Western Reserve Road, the highway has not experienced any major changes since its inception.

Major intersections

References

External links

626
Transportation in Mahoning County, Ohio